Real Madrid Club de Fútbol is a professional football club based in Madrid, Spain. The club first participated in a European competition in 1955. The first international cup they took part in was the Latin Cup in which they participated as champions of Spain. The competition lasted from 1949 to 1957 and Real Madrid won both tournaments which they entered, the same number as Barcelona and Milan. Since becoming the first Spanish club to enter the European Cup in 1955, Real has competed in every UEFA-organized competition, except the Intertoto Cup and Conference League. They have missed out on European football only twice in their history, in the 1977–78 and 1996–97 seasons.

Real Madrid has had the most success in the European Cup, winning the trophy for a record fourteen times. Real was the winner of the inaugural edition of the tournament and remains the only club to win the trophy five times in a row (the first five editions). It also holds the distinction of being the only club to defend the title in the Champions League era, as well as to win it three times in a row. The club has also won the UEFA Cup twice, in 1985 and 1986, the Super Cup five times, in 2002, 2014, 2016, 2017, and 2022, the Intercontinental Cup three times, in 1960, 1998, and 2002, and the FIFA Club World Cup five times, in 2014, 2016, 2017, 2018 and 2022. Real Madrid, with 29 continental and worldwide trophies, is the most successful team in international club football.

In the tables (H) denotes home ground, (A) denotes away ground, (N) symbolises neutral ground and (P) penalty shoot-out. The first score is always Real Madrid's.

Latin Cup
In 1949, the football federations of Spain, Italy, France and Portugal launched their own club competition. European clubs could not afford hefty travel costs so the Copa Latina was staged at the end of every season in a single host country. The competition featured two semi-finals, a third place play-off and a final. As La Liga champions in 1955, Real Madrid represented Spain in the 1955 edition of the competition. They defeated Belenenses 2–0 in their semi-final at the Parc des Princes in Paris, before beating Reims 2–0 in the final at the same venue. Real Madrid won the 1957 competition at the Santiago Bernabéu, defeating Milan in the semi-finals and then Benfica 1–0 in the final. After the introduction of the European Cup, the Latin Cup was discontinued and nowadays it is not recognized by UEFA.

European Cup / UEFA Champions League
The European Cup was inaugurated in 1955 as a tournament for the champions of European national leagues, with Real Madrid winning the first five editions. However, after winning the trophy five times in a row in the 1950s, and again in 1966, the club experienced mixed fortunes until the end of the 1990s. Since then, Real Madrid has won the competition eight times, in 1998, 2000, 2002, 2014, 2016, 2017, 2018, and 2022 and established itself as one of the premier sides in European football.

European / UEFA Cup Winners' Cup
The Cup Winners' Cup started in 1960 as a tournament for the winners of national cup competitions, but it took eleven years for Real Madrid to participate for the first time. In their first appearance, Madrid advanced to the final but lost there to Chelsea in a replay. In 1975, the club's second participation, Real advanced to the quarter-finals, losing to Red Star Belgrade in a two-legged tie on penalties. They advanced to their second final in 1983; however, Real's aspirations to get a hold on the trophy were cut short by Alex Ferguson's Aberdeen in a thrilling extra time victory. Madrid advanced to the quarter-finals in their last participation in 1994, before the tournament was absorbed into the UEFA Cup in 1999. This is the only European tournament to date that Real Madrid has participated in but never won.

UEFA Cup / UEFA Europa League
The Inter-Cities Fairs Cup was established on 18 April 1955, two weeks after the European Cup, to promote trade fairs with various cities playing against each other. From 1958 onwards, the organizers moved to club participation, but the teams still had to come from cities staging trade fairs. The tournament is considered to be the forerunner of the UEFA Cup, but it is not recognized as a UEFA competition. As such, Inter-Cities Fairs Cup wins do not count toward the tally of the UEFA Cup/Europa League. Real Madrid never participated in the Fairs Cup before it was subsumed into the UEFA Cup in 1971. In the UEFA Cup, the club has won the trophy twice in a row, in 1985 and 1986. Real has never participated in the competition since it was rebranded to the UEFA Europa League.

European / UEFA Super Cup
The European Super Cup was inaugurated in 1973 as a way of determining the best team in Europe, by pitting the holders of the European Champion Clubs' Cup against the winners of the Cup Winners' Cup. Since 2000, it has been contested by winners of the Champions League and the UEFA Cup (later Europa League), as the Cup Winners' Cup was discontinued in 1999. Real Madrid first participated in the 1998 edition, after they won the 1997–98 UEFA Champions League, losing 0–1 to Chelsea. Real's first trophy came in 2002 with a 3–1 victory over Feyenoord. Since then, they have won the Super Cup four times, in 2014, 2016, 2017, and 2022, sharing the record for the most titles with Milan and Barcelona.

Intercontinental Cup / FIFA Club World Cup
In 1960, UEFA and their South-American equivalent, the South American Football Confederation (CONMEBOL), created the Intercontinental Cup as a way of determining the best team in the world, by pitting the winners of the European Cup and the Copa Libertadores against each other. In 2000, FIFA launched their international club competition called the FIFA Club World Championship, featuring teams from all of its member associations. In the second edition — renamed the FIFA Club World Cup — in 2005, FIFA took over the Intercontinental Cup, subsuming it into its own competition.

In January 2000, Real Madrid were invited to the inaugural championship in Brazil, by virtue of winning the 1998 Intercontinental Cup in the previous season. The club finished fourth overall, after losing the third place play-off on penalties to Mexico's Necaxa. They initially qualified for the 2001 tournament, in their native Spain, but the competition was cancelled before it started. Real Madrid have won the FIFA Club World Cup a record five times since then (in 2014, 2016, 2017, 2018 and 2022).

Overall record
Accurate as of 15 March 2023.

Legend: GF = Goals For. GA = Goals Against. GD = Goal Difference.

References
In the UEFA references, access to the specific rounds is achievable by the adjacent table.

International football
Spanish football clubs in international competitions